This is a list of the 22 members of the European Parliament for Portugal in the 2009 to 2014 session.

List

Notes

2009
List
Portugal